Vulcan/Kirkcaldy Aerodrome  is located  southwest of Vulcan, Alberta, Canada. The airport, which was reopened in 2011, was originally RCAF Station Vulcan as part of the British Commonwealth Air Training Plan during the Second World War.

References

Registered aerodromes in Alberta